Lake of Two Mountains High School (LTM) is an Anglophone public high school in Deux-Montagnes, Quebec in the Laurentides region. It is a part of the Sir Wilfrid Laurier School Board.

The school's service area includes Deux Montagnes, Kanesatake, southern portions of Mirabel, Oka, Pointe-Calumet, Saint-Eustache, Saint-Placide, Ste-Marthe-sur-le-Lac, and St-Joseph-du-Lac. As of 2014 55 students from Kanesatake choose to attend Lake of Two Mountains.

The current campus was built in 1983, replacing the previous facility.

Programs
 the school has the "16 Plus" alternative education program for students at risk of dropping out of high school altogether; they may receive a life skills diploma, but not a full high school diploma, if they graduate from this program.

References

External links
 Lake of Two Mountains High School

High schools in Quebec
English-language schools in Quebec
Schools in Laurentides